Almaty Emergency Hospital (also known as Ambulance Hospital of Amaty) was founded in 1896 in Almaty by the Red Cross Society.  It then had 15 beds and was the only medical resource in the city. The first head doctor was the graduate of the St. Petersburg army medical college Ieronim Ivanovich Sobolevsky. It has changed its name several times.

The present building was opened on February 14, 2011. It has 355 hospital beds, and an  intensive care unit for 12 patients.   Dzhuvashev Almaz Bolatovich is the medical director.

References

Hospitals in Kazakhstan
1896 establishments in the Russian Empire
Hospitals established in 1896